The Committee of Fourteen was founded on January 16, 1905, by members of the New York Anti-Saloon League as an association dedicated to the abolition of Raines law hotels.

History
While blue laws banned saloons from selling alcoholic beverages on Sundays, the Raines law of 1896 permitted hotels to do so. When saloon keepers responded by creating bedrooms, which were then used for prostitution, the Committee demanded inspections of premises to distinguish between legitimate hotels and saloons. On May 1, 1905, a law was passed that a city inspection had to occur before a license was issued. By 1911, most Raines Law hotels had closed, but the Committee remained active until it ran out of money in 1932, when it was disbanded.

Members of the Committee
William Henry Baldwin, Jr.
Walter G. Hooke
Alice Davis Menken
James Pedersen
John P. Peters
Mary Kingsbury Simkhovitch
George Haven Putnam
Francis Louis Slade
Percy S. Straus
Lawrence Veiller
Frederick H. Whitin
George E. Worthington
Raymond B. Fosdick

See also
Committee of Fifteen

Notes 
 Research Committee of the Committee of Fourteen. (1910). The social evil in New York city : a study of law enforcement
 Research Committee of the Committee of Fourteen. (1912, 1914, 1916, 1917, 1919–1924). Annual Report
 Research Committee of the Committee of Fourteen. (1914-1915). Annual Report

References

Prostitution in New York (state)
1905 establishments in New York City
1932 disestablishments in New York (state)
Organizations based in New York (state)
Organizations established in 1905
Organizations disestablished in 1932